Anna Weinberg has been a restaurateur since the late 1990s. Before that, she was an actress.  Weinberg is a co-owner and managing partner of Big Night Restaurant Group.

When she was living in NYC and working in restaurants, she met Melissa O’Donnell and when she was 23, they opened a restaurant named Stella.

Early life
Weinberg grew up in Waiheke Island, New Zealand and moved to New York City when she was 19. She moved to San Francisco with James Nicholas, her business partner and future husband (they have since divorced).

Career
Along with Nancy Oakes and Ken Fulk, she opened Tosca Cafe in North Beach, San Francisco. They took over the spot in 2019 from previous owners April Bloomfield and Ken Friedman.

She has been involved with several other restaurants including Marlowe’s, Park Tavern, The Cavalier, Petit Marlowe, Leo’s Oyster Bar, Marianne’s, and Cow  arlowe.

She has said Jonathan Waxman, with whom she worked at Barbuto taught her everything she knows.

References

American women restaurateurs
American restaurateurs
People from Waiheke Island
New Zealand restaurateurs
20th-century American actresses
New Zealand emigrants to the United States
Year of birth missing (living people)
Living people